William Edward Culp (June 11, 1887 – September 3, 1969) was an American professional baseball pitcher. In 4 career games, he had a 0–0 record with an 8.10 ERA. He batted right and left and threw right-handed.

Culp was born in Bellaire, Ohio and died in Arnold, Pennsylvania.

References

External links
Baseball Reference.com page

1887 births
1969 deaths
Major League Baseball pitchers
Philadelphia Phillies players
Baseball players from Ohio
People from Bellaire, Ohio
Battle Creek Crickets players
York White Roses players
Atlantic City (minor league baseball) players